Chakmut Island is an island in Khabarovsk Krai, Russia, located in the Sea of Japan to the west of Sakhalin Island. The island is uninhabited and covered in forest, with a beach around the edges, and is home to a variety of birds.

In late 2017, the island gained attention in most Russian and some international mass media when its owner, Narek Oganisyan (or Hovhannisyan), proposed to use it for tourism activities, including live quest games, ecotourism and birdwatching.

References 

Islands of Khabarovsk Krai
Tourist attractions in Russia